Tom DeSimone (born 1939) is an American director, writer, producer and editor, perhaps best known for directing the cult films Chatterbox (1977), Hell Night (1981), and The Concrete Jungle (1982).

Writer/ director, Tom DeSimone, was born in Cambridge MA. He received his Bachelor's Degree in directing from Emerson College in Boston and then headed West to UCLA where he earned a Master's Degree in Motion Picture production. Following graduation Tom worked briefly as Post Production Supervisor at Bosustow Productions in West Los Angeles, after which he formed his own production company for the burgeoning adult film market which presented the opportunity to produce and direct feature films and a lucrative career in that industry followed. CHATTERBOX, the cult musical sexcapade, released by American International, was Tom's crossover film from the adult film world to mainstream Hollywood features. The title "cult film director" seemed to follow Tom's career. His horror feature, HELL NIGHT, starring Linda Blair and his send-up of women's prison films, REFORM SCHOOL GIRLS, starring Wendy O Williams remain on everyone's list of genre classics. THE CONCRETE JUNGLE and New World Pictures, ANGEL III THE FINAL CHAPTER, followed. After signing with Creative Artist's Agency he moved from features to television where the remainder of his career has been in directing episodic television for various production studios and networks including. Lorimar, Warner Bros, MGM Television, CBS Television, and USA Network. Tom also did a one-year stint in Mexico City where he directed all 120 episodes of the Telenova, ACAPULCO BAY, for Televisa Studios. His awards include a Golden Eagle award/Cine Film Festival for his short, WOODEN LULLABY; a UCLA Film School scholarship for his film, THE GAME, and a Lifetime Achievement award in the 2005 Gayvn Hall of Fame. Tom now resides in Palm Springs.

Career
DeSimone began his career as a director of numerous adult films in the late 1960s, including several gay pornography films under the pseudonym Lancer Brooks. His 1970 film The Collection was the first X-rated gay feature film to include dialogue and a plot. He would later become known for directing the cult film Chatterbox (1977), produced by Bruce Cohn Curtis. Curtis would then hire him to direct his subsequent film, the cult slasher film Hell Night (1981).

He also directed the films The Concrete Jungle and Reform School Girls, and the television series Freddy's Nightmares and Dark Justice.

Filmography

Film

Television

References

Sources

External links

1939 births
American film directors
American pornographic film directors
American pornographic film producers
American television directors
American film producers
American male screenwriters
Living people